The 1982–83 NCAA football bowl games featured 16 games starting early in December and ending on January 1, 1983. The Aloha Bowl was introduced this year.

Schedule